This is a list of songs which reached number one on the Billboard Mainstream Top 40 (or Pop Songs) chart in 2021.

During 2021, a total of 13 singles hit number-one on the charts.

Chart history

See also 

 2021 in American music

References

External links 

 Current Billboard Pop Songs chart

Billboard charts
Mainstream Top 40 2021
United States Mainstream Top 40